The Confederation of Trade Unions of Yugoslavia (SSJ) was a mass organization in SFR Yugoslavia that operated as both a centralized body of trade unions and a socio-political organ of the Yugoslav government. It existed as one of the most powerful organizations within the Socialist Alliance of Working People of Yugoslavia, the popular front of the ruling League of Communists. In addition to assisting in the implementation of the Party's domestic labor programs, the SSJ actively sent labor delegations abroad to other countries, with 190 such delegations having been sent in the year 1959 alone. The organization maintained relations with both Western and Eastern labor unions and represented Yugoslavia at the International Labour Organization.

The SSJ was dissolved and succeeded by numerous smaller organizations across the six Yugoslav republics shortly before the Yugoslav Wars in 1990:

 Association of Free Trade Unions of Slovenia
 Confederation of Autonomous Trade Unions of Serbia
 Confederation of Independent Trade Unions of Bosnia and Herzegovina
 Confederation of Independent Trade Unions of Montenegro
 Federation of Trade Unions of Macedonia
 Union of Autonomous Trade Unions of Croatia

Affiliates

References

Trade unions in Yugoslavia
Trade unions established in 1945
Trade unions disestablished in 1990
1945 establishments in Yugoslavia
1990 disestablishments in Yugoslavia